This is a list of cheeses and producers from Ireland.

List of Irish cheese producers

List of Irish cheeses

See also

 List of British cheeses
 List of Republic of Ireland food and drink products with protected status
 List of cheeses
 List of cheesemakers

References

Further reading
Freeman, Sarah (1998) The Real Cheese Companion: a guide to the best handmade cheeses of Britain and Ireland. London: Little, Brown

Irish
Ireland-related lists